George Colfax Baldwin ( – ) was an American Baptist clergyman.

He graduated from Madison University, Hamilton, New York, and was for many years pastor of the First Baptist Church in Troy, New York. He was author of Representative Women of the Bible (New York, 1855), Representative Men of the New Testament (1859), and The Model Prayer, a volume of lectures (Boston, 1870), and other works. George Colfax Baldwin died on 29 November 1899 in Troy.

Created via preloaddraft
1817 births
1899 deaths
Colgate University alumni
19th-century Baptist ministers from the United States
People from Passaic County, New Jersey
People from Troy, New York
Religious leaders from New York (state)